Lapoș River may refer to:

 Lapoș River (Bicaz)
 Lapoș, a tributary of the Ciobănuș in Bacău County

See also 
 Lapoș